Little Conococheague Creek is a  tributary stream of the Potomac River in the U.S. states of Maryland and Pennsylvania. The stream rises on Two Top Mountain, west of the Whitetail Ski Resort in Franklin County, Pennsylvania, and proceeds south into Washington County, Maryland. Tributaries include Toms Run.

See also
List of rivers of Maryland
List of rivers of Pennsylvania

References

 

Rivers of Washington County, Maryland
Rivers of Maryland
Rivers of Pennsylvania
Rivers of Fulton County, Pennsylvania
Tributaries of the Potomac River